The 2009 ACC Trophy Challenge was a cricket tournament in Chiang Mai, Thailand, taking place between 12 and 21 January 2009. It gave Associate and Affiliate members of the Asian Cricket Council experience of international one-day cricket and also formed part of the regional qualifications  for the ICC World Cricket League. The top 2 teams were promoted to the ACC Trophy Elite Division. Bhutan also qualified for the  WCL82010

Teams
After the 2006 ACC Trophy a decision was made to split the tournament into two divisions. The placement of teams in these divisions was determined by the final rankings in the previous tournament. The top ten teams went into the 2008 ACC Trophy Elite with the remaining teams taking part in the 2009 ACC Trophy Challenge. They were also joined by China who had not previously taken part in the tournament.

Qualified through participation in 2006 ACC Trophy:

Newcomers to the ACC Trophy:

Squads

Group stage

Points Tables
Green denotes teams going into the semifinals. Yellow denotes teams that play in the fifth place playoff and remain in the ACC Trophy Challenge Division. Red denotes teams that play in the seventh place playoff and remain in the ACC Trophy Challenge Division.

Fixtures and results

Semifinals
Winners of the semifinals were promoted to the ACC Trophy Elite Division and qualified for the final.

Final and Playoffs

Final Placings

Statistics

References

External links
2009 ACC Trophy Challenge – Official Site

2009
International cricket competitions in 2009
2009 in Thai sport
International cricket competitions in Thailand